Copa del Rey de Voleibol is the second top flight volleyball competition played in Spain. The inaugural edition was played in 1950. It is hosted by Real Federación Española de Voleibol. The competition was renamed "Copa del Generalisimo" until 1976 due to the Francoist regime.

The top six teams at half-season in Superliga play the Copa del Rey, generally in late January.

Winners by year

Wins by teams

See also
Superliga Masculina
Supercopa de España

References

External links
Spanish Volleyball Federation